Beata Stremler (born 13 September 1984) is a Polish dressage rider. She represented Poland at the 2012 Summer Olympics in the team and individual dressage.

References

External links
 

Living people
1984 births
Polish female equestrians
Polish dressage riders
Olympic equestrians of Poland
Equestrians at the 2012 Summer Olympics
Sportspeople from Warsaw